Winter's Eve is the thirteenth studio album and second Christmas-themed album by Nox Arcana. It was released in 2009 on Monolith Graphics. Apart from traditional music for the Christmas season, the theme of this album evokes a medieval or pagan Yuletide celebration typical of the winter solstice.

Track listing
All music composed and performed by Joseph Vargo. "Greensleeves" (traditional) arranged by Joseph Vargo.

 "The Messenger" — 1:18
 "Frozen Memories" — 2:45
 "Magic and Moonlight" — 3:25
 "The Rose of Winter" — 2:24
 "Enchanted Realm" — 2:35
 "The Ides of December" — 4:21
 "Gifts of the Magi" — 3:01
 "Season of Wonder" — 2:44
 "Solstice Dance" — 2:30
 "The White Queen" — 2:53
 "Winter's Eve" — 4:19 
 "Starlight Serenade" — 3:31
 "Greensleeves" — 4:09
 "The Longest Night" — 4:02
 "Pax Terra" — 3:01
 "Winds of Change" — 3:39
 "Fading Embers" — 2:07
 "Crystal Chimes" — 2:08
 "Serenity" — 2:41
 "Winter Rhapsody" — 3:28
 "Time Slips Away" — 5:35
 The song "Time Slips Away ends at 4:00. An untitled hidden track starts at 4:25.

References

External links 
 
[ Winter's Eve] at Allmusic

Nox Arcana albums
2009 albums
2009 Christmas albums
Christmas albums by American artists